Hard Attack is the second and final album by Dust, released by Kama Sutra Records in 1972. The cover art featured a previously published piece by Frank Frazetta titled "Snow Giants".

Track listing

Personnel
Dust
Richie Wise - electric and acoustic guitars, vocals
Marc Bell - drums
Kenny Aaronson - bass, steel, dobro and bottleneck guitars
with:
Fred Singer (of Thog) - piano, organ
Larry Wilcox - arranger and conductor of strings
Technical
Harry Yarmark - engineer
Glen Christensen - art direction

References

1972 albums
Albums produced by Kenny Aaronson
Kama Sutra Records albums
Albums with cover art by Frank Frazetta